The 2022–23 C.F. Pachuca season, commonly referred to as Pachuca. The team will participate in the Liga MX.

After losing in the 2022 Clausura final, Pachuca won the 2022 Apertura championship, defeating Toluca 8–2 over the two legs. After an aggregate 2–2 score, Pachuca advanced from the quarter-finals by virtue of finishing ahead of Tigres during the regular phase.

Players

Squad Information
Players and squad numbers last updated on 4 July 2022. Appearances include all competitions.Note: Flags indicate national team as has been defined under FIFA eligibility rules. Players may hold more than one non-FIFA nationality.

Transfers and loans

Transfers In

Transfers Out

Pre-season and friendlies

Competitions

Overview

Liga MX

Torneo Apertura

League table

Results summary

Results round by round

Matches
The league fixtures were announced on 29 May 2022.

References

Mexican football clubs 2022–23 season
2023 CONCACAF Champions League participants seasons